George Grenville Benedict (10 December 1826 – 8 April 1907) was an American soldier who fought in the American Civil War. Benedict was awarded the country's highest award for bravery during combat, the Medal of Honor, for his action during the Battle of Gettysburg in Pennsylvania on July 3, 1863. He was honored with the award on 27 June 1892.

Biography
Benedict was born on 10 December 1826 in Burlington, Vermont. He entered the University of Vermont and graduated with honors in 1847, receiving the degree of Master of Arts in 1850. While a student he became a member of the Sigma Phi Society as well as the Phi Beta Kappa honor society. He was married on the 27th of October 1853 to Mary Anne, the daughter of Edward and Abigail Frances Kellogg of New Canaan, NY.

He was editor and publisher of The Burlington Daily Free Press in Burlington, Vermont. He served as the president of the Vermont & Boston Telegraph Company from 1859 to 1863; was elected by the people of Chittenden county as a member of the Vermont Senate 1869-71; and served as the secretary of the Corporation of the University of Vermont and State Agricultural College from 1865 to 1879. He was selected as a delegate to the Republican National Convention in 1880. Also in 1880, Benedict was elected to the University of Vermont Board of Trustees.

Military career
Benedict enlisted into the 12th Vermont Infantry at Burlington in August 1862. On the third day of the Battle of Gettysburg, he was among a group of men involved in the successful flank attack on Pickett's Charge, for which he gained the Medal of Honor. In 1863, he was promoted to a lieutenant, and later appointed aid-de-camp on the staff of Gen. George J. Standard, commanding the 2nd Brigade of Vermont Volunteers. By 1865, he held the office of assistant inspector general with the rank of major. Rising again in 1866, Benedict was appointed aide-de-camp to Governor Paul Dillingham with the rank of colonel. Colonel Benedict was appointed to be military historian of the State of Vermont by Governor Redfield Proctor in 1879.

Books
During his nine-month stint in the Army, Benedict wrote back letters to the newspaper, The Burlington Daily Free Press, for publishing. After the war he later compiled these letters into a two-volume work Vermont in the Civil War: A History of the Part Taken by the Vermont Soldiers and Sailors in the War for the Union 1861-1865 in 1866.

In 1895 he also published Army Life in Virginia: Letters from the Twelfth Vermont Regiment and Personal Experiences of Volunteer Service in the War for the Union 1862-1863.

Memberships
Benedict was a member of the Military Order of the Loyal Legion of the United States and the Vermont Society of the Sons of the American Revolution.  He was elected a member of the American Antiquarian Society in 1899.

Death
Colonel Benedict died in April 1907 in Burlington, Vermont.  He is buried in the Greenmount Cemetery in that city.

Medal of Honor citation
Rank and organization: Second Lieutenant, Company C, 12th Vermont Infantry. Place and date: At Gettysburg, Pa., 3 July 1863.

See also

 Battle of Gettysburg, Third Day cavalry battles
 List of Medal of Honor recipients for the Battle of Gettysburg
 List of American Civil War Medal of Honor recipients: A–F

References

1826 births
1907 deaths
People of Vermont in the American Civil War
Union Army officers
United States Army Medal of Honor recipients
American Civil War recipients of the Medal of Honor
Members of the American Antiquarian Society
Sons of the American Revolution
American newspaper editors